Chegha Cheshmeh (also Romanized as Cheghā Cheshmeh, Chogha Chashmeh, and Chaghā Cheshmeh; also known as Chaqā Cheshmeh) is a village in Kheybar Rural District, Choghamish District, Dezful County, Khuzestan Province, Iran. At the 2006 census, its population was 264, in 48 families.

References 

Populated places in Dezful County